The Thomas Scott Buckham Memorial Library is a historic library in Faribault, Minnesota, United States.

History
The public library as a tax-supported institution in Faribault dates from 1897, when it was housed in the City Hall building. Mrs. Anna Buckham gave the Thomas Scott Buckham Memorial Library building to the City of Faribault in memory of her husband.  The cornerstone was laid in September 1929, and dedication of the building took place on July 20, 1930.

Architecture
The library's architecture has Greek themes; Buckham was an avid reader and scholar of Greek literature. A stained glass window made by Charles Jay Connick was emplaced in the building's tower. The second floor has a Greek mural painted by Alfred J. Hyslop depicts scenes from Athens, Sparta, Delphi, and Olympia.

References

External links
GoogleMap to Library
Online Catalog

Art Deco architecture in Minnesota
Buildings and structures in Faribault, Minnesota
Education in Rice County, Minnesota
Libraries on the National Register of Historic Places in Minnesota
Library buildings completed in 1930
Public libraries in Minnesota
National Register of Historic Places in Rice County, Minnesota